Misumena oblonga is a spider species found in Yarkant County of western China. A close relative, also from the Misumena genus, is Misumena vatia.

See also
 List of Thomisidae species

References

Thomisidae
Spiders of China
Spiders described in 1885